The Athenian Captive is an 1838 tragedy by the British writer Thomas Talfourd. It was originally intended to be performed at Covent Garden in London but after rehearsals the illness of one of the actresses forced delays. This led him to take it instead to the Theatre Royal, Haymarket where it premiered on 4 August 1838. The Haymarket cast was led by William Macready as Thoas and Mary Warner and Isme, and the production enjoyed success. Other cast members included James Prescott Warde as Creon, Henry Howe as Lycus and Helena Faucit as Creusa. Talfourd dedicated the play to Lord Denman, the Lord Chief Justice.

References

Bibliography
 Macqueen-Pope, Walter. Haymarket: Theatre of Perfection. W.H. Allen, 1948.
 Nicoll, Allardyce. A History of Early Nineteenth Century Drama 1800-1850. Cambridge University Press, 1930.

1838 plays
West End plays
British plays
Tragedy plays
Historical plays
Plays set in ancient Greece